{{DISPLAYTITLE:C17H19N5O}}
The molecular formula C17H19N5O (molar mass: 309.36 g/mol, exact mass: 309.1590 u) may refer to:

 ATL-444
 Bazinaprine (SR-95,191)

Molecular formulas